Ssajib is the fourth album by South Korean singer Psy. The album was released on July 24, 2006, through his own label Yamazone Music and distributed by Seoul Records (now known as Kakao M). The album contains 14 songs including the main single "Entertainer".

Background and release
Ssajib was released on July 24, 2006. During his first interview regarding the album, he described the album as "a high class hotel buffet" and aimed to "recite himself through different genres. Also, Psy said it was an album that he can be content with and an upgrade to his career." "Instant" is a song that features Kim Tae-woo aims to satirize one night stands, as well as making Kim Tae-woo reborn as an adult star. The song "knock" featuring Ivy is an electro dance song. 

Regarding the title song "Entertainer", he described it as a song that is about the worship of girls." The music video for the song "Entertainer" was released on the same day of the album release. Out of 14 songs, all songs except 3 songs ("Yangachi", "Psycho Party", and "Dead Poet's Society") passed the test of the censorship bureau of MBC which startled the singer, since "Instant" and "Drinking" contained references to one night stands and alcohol. For KBS, only 5 songs did not pass the censorship. The album was released in digital disc form which prevents illegal copies.

Accolades

Track listing

Charts and sales

Monthly charts

Year-end charts

Sales

References

2006 albums
Korean-language albums
Psy albums
Kakao M albums